Ozerovo is the name of several rural localities in Russia:
Ozerovo, Belgorod Oblast, a selo in Yakovlevsky District of Belgorod Oblast
Ozerovo, Kaliningrad Oblast, a settlement in Kovrovsky Rural Okrug of Zelenogradsky District of Kaliningrad Oblast
Ozerovo, Kostroma Oblast, a village in Chukhlomskoye Settlement of Chukhlomsky District of Kostroma Oblast
Ozerovo, Kursk Oblast, a village in Shestopalovsky Selsoviet of Zolotukhinsky District of Kursk Oblast
Ozerovo, Oryol Oblast, a village in Arkhangelsky Selsoviet of Uritsky District of Oryol Oblast
Ozerovo, Ostrovsky District, Pskov Oblast, a village in Ostrovsky District, Pskov Oblast
Ozerovo, Strugo-Krasnensky District, Pskov Oblast, a village in Strugo-Krasnensky District, Pskov Oblast